Sir John Henry William Schroder, 1st Baronet and Baron von Schröder (13 February 1825 – 20 April 1910) was an Anglo-German merchant banker, his firm being Schroders PLC.  He was known as Baron Sir John Henry Schroder.

Schroder was born Baron Johann Heinrich Wilhelm Schröder in Hamburg, Germany, the fourth of twelve children of Baron Johann Heinrich von Schröder (in the Prussian nobility) and Henriette von Schwartz.  Both his parents were born into prominent Hamburg merchant families.

In 1814, at the age of 16, Sir John joined the London office of the banking house founded by his father.

He later moved to England and was created a Baronet of The Dell, in the Baronetcy of the United Kingdom, in 1892.  The title became extinct upon his death.

References
 Who's Who
 Schroder at Oxford Dictionary of National Biography

1825 births
1910 deaths
Businesspeople from Hamburg
British bankers
Prussian nobility
Barons of Germany
Baronets in the Baronetage of the United Kingdom
Schroders people
19th-century British businesspeople
German emigrants to England
British Lutherans